Frías District is one of ten districts of the Ayabaca province in Peru.

References